"Pen and Paper" is a song written by Diane and Eddie Kilroy and originally recorded by Jerry Lee Lewis, who released it as a single, with a cover of "Hit the Road Jack" on the other side, in 1963 on Smash Records.

The song was covered by Faron Young in 1965 and by Mickey Gilley in 1975.

Track listing

Charts

References 

1964 songs
1964 singles
Jerry Lee Lewis songs
Smash Records singles
American country music songs